Peter Carney is an American saxophonist, recording artist, and DJ from Chicago. His ensemble, Pete Carney and Orange Alert, is an acid jazz group that has performed in the UK and the United States.

Orange Alert 
Before launching Orange Alert, Carney traveled with soul singer Otis Clay and performed at jazz festivals in Italy, France, Germany, Norway, Finland, Sweden, England, and Germany. Carney’s composition Redline Groove, was lifted anonymously for the DePaul Basketball Band who played it during March Madness at Madison Square Garden.

Interactive Listening 
In 2009 he began working on a new method for listening to music, frustrated with the traditional music history textbooks that were available, Carney worked for two years to create a new educational system based on Socrates’ ancient method of continuous questioning, which he called Interactive Listening.

Personal life 
Carney studied with William Albright, William Bolcom, Bright Sheng, Donald Sinta, and Glenn Watkins. Turning to Jazz, he studied at the University of Miami and completed his Master’s in Jazz at Florida International University. Dr. Pete Carney received his Doctorate in Jazz from The University of Illinois. Recently he conducted the University of Illinois Concert Jazz Band and Orchestra at The Jazz Education Network Conference in Louisville KY.

Works

Solo albums 

 2004 Orange Alert
 2007 Redline Groove
 2010 Who Me?

References

External links 
   Pete Carney and Orange Alert official site

21st-century American male musicians
21st-century American saxophonists
Acid jazz musicians
American jazz saxophonists
American male saxophonists
Jazz musicians from Illinois
Living people
American male jazz musicians
Musicians from Chicago
Year of birth missing (living people)